Infanta Isabel Maria of Braganza; Queluz, 4 July 1801 – Benfica, then Belém, 22 April 1876 was a Portuguese infanta (princess) and fourth daughter of King John VI of Portugal and his wife Carlota Joaquina of Spain. She acted as regent for her brother Pedro IV and for her niece Maria II in 1826-1828.

Early life 
Her full name was Isabel Maria da Conceição Joana Gualberta Ana Francisca de Assis Xavier de Paula de Alcântara Antónia Rafaela Micaela Gabriela Joaquina Gonzaga de Bragança e Bourbon. She was a titular of the Great-Cross of the Order of Our Lady of Conception; Dame of the orders of Saint Isabel and of the Noble Dames of Mary Louise and awarded with the Starry Cross of Austria.

Regency 
Because Prince Pedro, who was heir to the throne, had just proclaimed the independence of Brazil, Prince Miguel was in Vienna, Queen Carlota Joaquina was exiled in Queluz and Isabel's older sisters (Maria Teresa and Maria Francisca of Assisi) had married to Spanish infantes (princes), Isabel Maria was chosen to be Regent of the Kingdom until the recently crowned Emperor of Brazil (Pedro I of Brazil and future Pedro IV of Portugal) returned. Pedro IV, however, immediately abdicated in favour of his daughter Maria da Glória (who became Maria II of Portugal), who was in London, with the condition that she should marry her uncle Miguel. Isabella Maria continued as regent until 1828, when a civil war started between absolutists, supporting Miguel, and liberals, supporting Maria II (called the Liberal War) that would end with a liberal victory and defeat and consequent exile of Miguel.

Later life 
Isabel Maria retired from politics and turned her life to religion. She died unmarried in Benfica (at the time not a neighbourhood of Lisbon but a near town in Belém municipality) on 22 April 1876. She was the last surviving child of John VI of Portugal and the last grandchild of Maria I of Portugal. She is buried in the Royal Pantheon of the House of Braganza.

Ancestry

References 

|-

1801 births
1876 deaths
Regents of Portugal
Portuguese infantas
House of Braganza
Burials at the Monastery of São Vicente de Fora
Knights Grand Cross of the Order of the Immaculate Conception of Vila Viçosa
Dames of the Order of Saint Isabel
People from Lisbon
19th-century Portuguese people
19th-century women rulers
Daughters of kings